Veenhusen is a village in the municipality of Moormerland in Leer District, Lower Saxony, northwestern Germany.

Formerly an independent municipality, Veenhusen was fused with ten other villages during the municipal reform of January 1, 1973 to form Moormerland.

In 2007 the village had a population of 3,848 residents.

The Veenhusen Church dates from around 1400 and contains a church organ built by Johann Gottfried Rohlfs between 1801 and 1802.

References

Towns and villages in East Frisia